Kilometro may refer to:

 Kilometre, a unit of length in the metric system, equal to one thousand metres
 "Kilometro" (song), a 2014 song by Sarah Geronimo